The 1988–89 Sri Lankan cricket season marked the beginning of domestic first-class cricket in the country.

Honours
 Lakspray Trophy – Nondescripts Cricket Club & Sinhalese Sports Club shared title
 Brown's Trophy – Sinhalese Sports Club
 Most runs – DSBP Kuruppu 339 @ 113.00 (HS 126)
 Most wickets – SD Anurasiri 24 @ 13.12 (BB 8-53)

Test series
Sri Lanka played no home Test matches this season.

External sources
  CricInfo – brief history of Sri Lankan cricket
 CricketArchive – Tournaments in Sri Lanka

Further reading
 Wisden Cricketers' Almanack 1990

Sri Lankan cricket seasons from 1972–73 to 1999–2000